Brian Conway is a contemporary Irish fiddler.

Brian Conway is an American born Irish Fiddler. Born in 1961 to parents from County Tyrone in Northern Ireland, Brian Conway first studied with Limerick born fiddle player Martin Mulvihill. Brian soon also studied with Sligo born fiddle master Martin Wynne with whom Brian became  lifelong friends. A little over a year after starting the fiddle, Brian won the under 12 All Ireland Fiddle championship. The adjudicator was Sean Keane of the Chieftains.  Brian went on to win several additional All-Ireland medals including the senior All -Ireland fiddle championship in 1986. Brian also established a reputation for teaching students who went on to win All-Ireland fiddle awards including Patrick Mangan, Maeve Flanagan, Haley Richardson, and Andrew Caden.

References 

1961 births
Irish fiddlers
Living people
Place of birth missing (living people)
21st-century violinists
Green Linnet Records artists